Jawahar Navodaya Vidyalaya, Kanpur Dehat (JNVKAND) is a co-educational boarding school near Jalalpur, Kanpur Dehat district, India. JNVKAND is funded by the Indian Ministry of Human Resources Development.

Location
JNVKAND is located on Kanpur-Jhansi National High Way (NH-2) near Mati bus stand at a distance 3 km. Nearest railway station is Rura (NCR) at a distance 22 km. Nearest airport is at Chakeri, Kanpur.

History
The school was established in the year 1999 near Jalalpur village by the Navodaya Vidyalaya Samiti.

Games 
Basketball court, valley ball court  &  400 meter track are available.  Football team has its better place in district .

List of Principals
 Laxmi Devi ( 18/08/1999 to 22/12/1999)
  J.S. Chauhan (27/12/1999 to 30/07/2000)
  Suman Lata Yadav (31/07/2000 to 07/08/2001)
  I.P.S. Sengar (07/08/2001 to 31/12/2003)
  S.K. Mishra (01/01/2004 to 30/05/2004)
  Archana Singh(31/05/2004 to 23/06/2014)
  A.K. Mishra (24/06/2014 to 02/07/2014)
  Yogendrta Bhakta (03/07/2014 to till date)

References

High schools and secondary schools in Uttar Pradesh
Jawahar Navodaya Vidyalayas in Uttar Pradesh
Education in Kanpur Dehat district
Educational institutions established in 1999
1999 establishments in Uttar Pradesh